Baroness Smith may refer to:

Elizabeth Smith, Baroness Smith of Gilmorehill (born 1940), British patron of the arts
Angela Smith, Baroness Smith of Basildon (born 1959), British politician
Julie Smith, Baroness Smith of Newnham (born 1969), British academic